Wadaad writing, also known as Wadaad Arabic, is the traditional Somali adaptation of written Arabic, as well as the Arabic script as historically used to transcribe the Somali language. Originally, it referred to an ungrammatical Arabic featuring some words in Somali, with the proportion of Somali vocabulary terms varying depending on the context. Alongside standard Arabic, wadaad writing was used by Somali religious men (wadaado) to record xeer (customary law) petitions and to write qasidas. It was also used by merchants for business and letter writing. Over the years, various Somali scholars improved and altered the use of the Arabic script for conveying Somali. This culminated in the 1950s with the Galal alphabet, which substantially modified letter values and introduced new letters for vowels.

History

The Arabic script was introduced to Somalia in the 13th century by Sheikh Yusuf bin Ahmad al-Kawneyn (colloquially referred to as Aw Barkhadle or the "Blessed Father"), a man described as "the most outstanding saint in Somalia." Of Somali descent, he sought to advance the teaching of the Qur'an. Al-Kawneyn devised a Somali nomenclature for the Arabic vowels, which enabled his pupils to read and write in Arabic. Shiekh Abi-Bakr Al Alawi, a Harari historian, states in his book that Yusuf bin Ahmad al-Kawneyn was of native and local Dir (clan) extraction.

Though various Somali wadaads and scholars had used the Arabic script to write in Somali for centuries, it would not be until the 19th century when the Qadiriyyah saint Sheikh Uways al-Barawi of the Digil and Mirifle clan would improve the application of the Arabic script to represent Somali. He applied it to the Maay dialect of southern Somalia, which at the time was the closest to standardizing Somali with the Arabic script. Al-Barawi modeled his alphabet after the Arabic transcription adopted by the Amrani of Barawa (Brava) to write their Swahili dialect, Bravanese.

Wadaad writing was often unintelligible to Somali pupils who learned standard Arabic in government-run schools. During the 1930s in the northwestern British Somaliland protectorate, Mahammad 'Abdi Makaahiil attempted to standardize the orthography in his book The Institution of Modern Correspondence in the Somali language. Following in the footsteps of Sh. Ibraahim 'Abdallah Mayal, Makaahiil therein championed the use of the Arabic script for writing Somali, showing examples of this usage through proverbs, letters and sentences.

Revision by J. S. King 
In 1887, British writer, J. S. King wrote for the Indian Antiquary an article titled "Somali as a written language" in which he proposes a standard Arabic based Somali script. Some of the main changes and features were the combined use of both Arabic and Sanskrit features:

 The Somali  sound is represented as a new character with influence from both  and 
 Somali  in this case is written as 
 A new  is introduced, with Sanskrit elements to form 
 Finally, a new  is proposed with two dots above the standard Arabic 

In this article, he provided over 100 examples of the script in use, some of which include:

Galaal Script 
In the 1954, the Somali linguist Musa Haji Ismail Galal (1917–1980) introduced a more radical alteration of Arabic to represent the Somali Language. Galal came up with an entirely new set of symbols for the Somali vowels. Lewis (1958) considered this to be the most accurate Arabic alphabet to have been devised for the Somali language. He had published his work in the Islamic Quarterly, outlining and providing examples as to why a new Arabic based script was needed for use in Somalia. This was different from other versions as every vowel and consonant was written, lowering the use of diacritics.

See also
 Osmanya alphabet
 Borama alphabet
 Kaddare alphabet
Far wadaad script converter https://www.haadka.com/far-wadaad/

Notes

References

 
 
 
 
 

Writing systems of Africa
Arabic alphabets
Somali language
Somali orthography